Daniel Osei Boateng (born 19 May 1981 in Accra) is a Ghanaian football player who, is playing for Liberty Professionals F.C.

References

1981 births
Living people
Ghanaian footballers
Ghana international footballers
Ghana under-20 international footballers
Footballers from Accra
Association football goalkeepers
Asante Kotoko S.C. players
King Faisal Babes FC players
Accra Great Olympics F.C. players
Heart of Lions F.C. players
Bofoakwa Tano F.C. players
Ghanaian expatriate footballers
Ghanaian expatriate sportspeople in England
Expatriate footballers in England